Melibiulose is a disaccharide formed from fructose and galactose similar to melibiose.

References

Disaccharides